Fer Corb ("chariot man"), son of Mug Corb, was, according to medieval Irish legend and historical tradition, a High King of Ireland. He came to power after killing his predecessor, and his father's killer, Irereo, in Ulster. He ruled for eleven years, until he was killed by Irereo's son Connla Cáem. The Lebor Gabála Érenn synchronises his reign with that of Ptolemy IV Philopator of Egypt (221–205 BC). The chronology of Geoffrey Keating's Foras Feasa ar Éirinn dates his reign to 330–319 BC, the Annals of the Four Masters to 474–463 BC.

References

Legendary High Kings of Ireland
4th-century BC rulers
Usurpers
Regicides
4th-century BC murdered monarchs